George Richardson (12 December 1912 – 1968) was a professional footballer, who played for Huddersfield Town and Sheffield United. He was born in Worksop, Nottinghamshire.

References

Bangor City Managers

1912 births
1968 deaths
English footballers
Footballers from Worksop
Association football forwards
English Football League players
Huddersfield Town A.F.C. players
Sheffield United F.C. players
Date of death missing